The 2010–11 or XIX Ukrainian Hockey Championship was the 19th annual edition of the Ukrainian Hockey Championship. It took place from 2010-12.

Regular season

Division A

Playoffs

Quarterfinals
 Bilyi Bars - HC Kharkiv 1:2
 Vorony Sumy - HC Kompanion 0:2

Semifinals 
 HC Kharkiv - HC Donbass 0:2
 HC Kompanion - Sokil Kyiv 1:2

3rd place
 HC Kharkiv - HC Kompanion 1:2

Final 
 Sokil Kyiv - HC Donbass 0:2

External links
Ukrainian Ice Hockey Federation
Facts and figures

Ukrainian Championship
Ukrainian Hockey Championship seasons
Ukr